Nine Mile Beach wind farm is the second windfarm generating power for the town of Esperance, Western Australia.  The other is Ten Mile Lagoon Wind Farm which is adjacent.  The farm generates 9.5 GWh of electricity per annum. 

Nine Mile Beach wind farm was commissioned in 2003.

References

Wind farms in Western Australia
Goldfields-Esperance